Saint-Léry is a commune in the Morbihan department of Brittany in north-western France. Inhabitants of Saint-Léry are called in French Saint-Léritins or Léritins.

See also
Communes of the Morbihan department

References

External links

 Mayors of Morbihan Association 

Saintlery